Paritosh Sen (26 September 1918 – 22 October 2008) was a leading Indian artist. He was born in Dhaka (then known as Dacca), the present-day capital of Bangladesh. He was a founder member of the Calcutta Group, an art movement established in 1942 that did much to introduce modernism into Indian art.

Sen pursued his artistic training at the Academie Andre Lhote, the Academie la Grande Chaumiere, the Ecole des Beaux Arts, and the Ecole des Louvre in Paris. Upon his return to India, he taught first in Bihar and then at Jadavpur University. 
He also taught art at The Daly College at Indore during the late 1940s.

In 1969 he was the recipient of the French Fellowship for Designing and Typeface and in 1970 he was awarded a Rockefeller Fellowship. Sen has exhibited widely both in India and abroad, including the Calcutta Group exhibition (1944), London (1962), São Paulo Biennale (1965), New Delhi Triennale (1968, 1971, 1975), Sweden (1984), and the Havana Biennale (1986).

In 1959/60, Sen published Zindabahar, a book of autobiographical sketches in which he memorialized the Dacca city of his childhood.

He died in Kolkata.

See also
Kurchi Dasgupta

References

Further reading
 Manasij Majumdar, Paritosh Sen: In Retrospect (Contemporary Indian Artists Series), Mapin Publishing (2007), 
 Paritosh Sen (Lalit Kala series on contemporary Indian art), Lalit Kala Akademi (1975)

External links
Hilarious treatment of protagonists, The Telegraph, 5 May 2006
, The Hindu, 19 August 2002

1918 births
2008 deaths
Bengali people
Artists from Dhaka
Indian male painters
Rockefeller Fellows
Fellows of the Lalit Kala Akademi
Academic staff of Jadavpur University
Alumni of the Académie de la Grande Chaumière
20th-century Indian painters
Artists from Kolkata
Painters from West Bengal